Magma is molten rock found under the Earth's surface.

Magma may also refer to:

Characters 
Magma (comics), a Marvel Comics character
Magma (Jonathan Darque), a supervillain enemy of Spider-Man
Magma (Dr. Stone), a character in the manga series Dr. Stone
Magma, a character in the anime Spider Riders
Magma (Gorath), a fictional character featured in the film Gorath
Alien Magma, an Ultra Seijin (fictional alien)
Team Magma, a fictional villainous team from Pokémon Ruby, and Pokémon Emerald, and Pokémon Omega Ruby

Mathematics and computing 
Magma (algebra), an algebraic structure consisting of a set together with a binary operation
Magma (cipher), the codename for GOST 28147-89 symmetric key block cipher
Magma (company), a developer of casting process simulator software
Magma Communications, a defunct Ottawa-based ISP acquired in early 2004 by Primus Canada
Magma (computer algebra system), a software package for solving mathematical problems
MagmaFS, an experimental filesystem for Linux and BSD kernels based on distributed hash tables
Category of magmas, with magmas as objects and morphisms given by homomorphisms of operations

Music 
Magma (band), a French experimental progressive rock band
Magma (Magma album), 1970 album
Magma (Gojira album), 2016 album
"Magma", a song by the 3rd and the Mortal from the album Painting on Glass

Places 
Magma, Arizona, U.S.
Magma, Nepal

Other 
Magma Design Automation, an electronic design automation software company
Magma (fly), a genus of flies in the family Muscidae
Magma (philosophy), a mode of Being in Cornelius Castoriadis' ontological paradigm
Magma: Volcanic Disaster, a 2006 television film
Magma, a 2007 novel by Thomas Thiemeyer
Magma Aviation, a freight airline

See also
 
 Magmar (disambiguation)